Ronald Musagala (born 16 December 1992 in Iganga) is a Ugandan middle-distance and long-distance runner.

At the 2013 World Championships in Moscow, he bowed out in the semi-finals of the 800 metres. He finished eighth in the 800 metres at the 2014 Commonwealth Games. He competed in the 1500 metres at the 2015 World Championships in Beijing but without advancing from the first round.

He competed at the 2020 Summer Olympics.

Musagala holds the national record in the 1500 metres.

International competitions

Personal bests

Outdoor
800 metres – 1:45.27 (Hengelo 2014)
1000 metres – 2:17.11 (Brussels 2014)
1500 metres – 3:30.58 (Monaco 2019)
Mile – 3:53.04 (Oslo 2021)
3000 metres - 7:44.78 (Ostrava 2018) 
5000 metres – 13:24.41 (Nijmegen 2015)

References

External links

Living people
1992 births
People from Iganga District
Ugandan male middle-distance runners
Ugandan male long-distance runners
Athletes (track and field) at the 2014 Commonwealth Games
Athletes (track and field) at the 2018 Commonwealth Games
Commonwealth Games competitors for Uganda
World Athletics Championships athletes for Uganda
Athletes (track and field) at the 2016 Summer Olympics
Olympic athletes of Uganda
Athletes (track and field) at the 2020 Summer Olympics
20th-century Ugandan people
21st-century Ugandan people